Scavenger receptors in endocrinology are inactive membrane receptors which bind certain hormones such as IGF-1 and do not transmit an intracellular response.

References

Membrane proteins
Cell-surface receptors